Minuscule 344 (in the Gregory-Aland numbering), ε 1007 (Soden), is a Greek minuscule manuscript of the New Testament, on parchment. Paleographically it has been assigned to the 10th century. 
It has marginalia.

Description 

The codex contains the text of the four Gospels on 327 parchment leaves with lacunae (Luke 13:21-16:23; 21:12-27; 22:12-23; 23:45-John 21:12). The lacking texts were supplied in the 16th century on paper. It is written in one column per page, in 19 lines per page.

There is also a division according to the Ammonian Sections (in Mark 237 Sections,  the last in 16:14), without references to the Eusebian Canons (written below Ammonian Section numbers).

Text 

The Greek text of the codex is a representative of the Byzantine text-type. Aland placed it in Category V.
According to the Claremont Profile Method it represents the textual family Kx in Luke 1 and Luke 20, and belongs to the textual cluster Ω. In Luke 10 no profile was made.

It does not contain the text of  Matthew 16:2b–3 (signs of the times) and John 21:25.

History 

The manuscript was examined by Scholz (Matthew and John) and Burgon. It was added to the list of New Testament manuscripts by Scholz (1794-1852).
C. R. Gregory saw it in 1886.

The manuscript is currently housed at the Biblioteca Ambrosiana (G. 16 sup.) in Milan.

See also 

 List of New Testament minuscules
 Biblical manuscript
 Textual criticism

References

Further reading 

 J. M. A. Scholz, Biblisch-kritische Reise (Leipzig, 1822), p. 70-73.

Greek New Testament minuscules
10th-century biblical manuscripts
Manuscripts of the Ambrosiana collections